The IPSC Finnish Action Air Championship is an IPSC level 3 Action Air championship held once a year by the Finnish Shooting Sport Federation.

Champions 
The following is a list of current and previous champions.

Overall category

See also 
IPSC Finnish Handgun Championship
IPSC Finnish Rifle Championship
IPSC Finnish Shotgun Championship
IPSC Finnish Tournament Championship

References 

Match Results - 2012 IPSC Finnish Action Air Championship
Match Results - 2013 IPSC Finnish Action Air Championship
Match Results - 2014 IPSC Finnish Action Air Championship
Match Results - 2015 IPSC Finnish Action Air Championship
Match Results - 2014 IPSC Finnish Action Air Championship. ipscfin.org
Match Results - 2016 IPSC Finnish Action Air Championship. ipscfin.org

IPSC shooting competitions
National shooting championships
Finland sport-related lists
Shooting competitions in Finland